Warren Van Wyck (born October 25, 1952) is an American Republican politician. On February 7, 2013 he was appointed a member of the Vermont House of Representatives after the death of incumbent Gregory S. Clark.

References

1952 births
Living people
Politicians from Paterson, New Jersey
Republican Party members of the Vermont House of Representatives
University of Vermont alumni
21st-century American politicians